Seiland  is the eighth largest island in mainland Norway, located in Troms og Finnmark county. The  island is divided between the municipalities of Alta and Hammerfest

Archeological excavations have shown that people have lived on Seiland for over 7000 years. Today, however the only people on it live in a few relatively isolated areas such as from Altneset to Hakkstabben on the southern tip of the island; Kårhamn on the northwestern side; and the Hønseby, Eidvågen, Fiskebukta, Survika areas in the northern part of the island. In 2006, the majority of central Seiland was designated as Seiland National Park.

There are two glaciers on Seiland: Seilandsjøkelen and Nordmannsjøkelen. There are a number of fjords located on the island including Lille Kufjorden, Store Kufjorden, Nordefjorden, and Jøfjorden.

See also
 List of islands of Norway

References

External links
 Map of Seiland

Alta, Norway
Hammerfest
Islands of Troms og Finnmark